The Cat (Spanish:La gata) is a 1956 French-Spanish drama film directed by Margarita Alexandre and Rafael María Torrecilla and starring Aurora Bautista, Jorge Mistral and José Nieto. It is set in the world of bullfighting. It was shot in Eastmancolor and Cinemascope.

Plot 
Her name is María, but everyone knows her by the nickname of The Cat. Daughter of the overseer of an Andalusian cortijo, she is wooed by several men of the village, among them the young Joselillo. But The Cat only feels love for Juan, a handsome and cocky worker who dreams of being a bullfighter.

Cast

References

Bibliography 
 Bentley, Bernard. A Companion to Spanish Cinema. Boydell & Brewer 2008.

External links 
 

1956 drama films
Spanish drama films
French drama films
1956 films
1950s Spanish-language films
1950s Spanish films
1950s French films
Spanish-language French films